Amedeo Escobar (1888–1973) was an Italian composer of film scores.

Selected filmography
 Resurrection (1931)
 The Last of the Bergeracs (1934)
 The Countess of Parma (1936)
 I've Lost My Husband! (1937)
 The Thrill of the Skies (1940)
 Macario Against Zagomar (1944)
 Toto Looks for a House (1949)
 Toto Looks for a Wife (1950)
 Beauties on Bicycles (1951)
 Drama on the Tiber (1952)

References

Bibliography 
 Christopher Frayling. Spaghetti Westerns: Cowboys and Europeans from Karl May to Sergio Leone. I.B.Tauris, 2006.

External links 
 

1888 births
1973 deaths
Italian composers
People from Pergola, Marche